This is a list of articles relating to the environment of the United Kingdom.

Anti-nuclear movement in the United Kingdom
Conservation in the United Kingdom
Climate of the United Kingdom
Climate change in the United Kingdom
Environmental inequality in the United Kingdom
Environmental issues in the United Kingdom
Environmental direct action in the United Kingdom
Recycling in the United Kingdom
Waste in the United Kingdom

See also
Environment of England
Environment of Northern Ireland
Environment of Scotland
Environment of Wales
Environment of the European Union

External links
Environment Agency of the UK government